Lost Creek Glacier is in the U.S. state of Oregon. The glacier is situated in the Cascade Range at an elevation generally above . Lost Creek Glacier is on the northwest slopes of South Sister, a dormant stratovolcano.

See also
 List of glaciers in the United States

References

Glaciers of Oregon
Glaciers of Lane County, Oregon